The brown wood turtle or brown land turtle (Rhinoclemmys annulata) is a species of turtle in the family Geoemydidae. The species is endemic to Central America and northern South America.

Taxonomy
R. annulata is one of nine species of turtles in the genus Rhinoclemmys.

Geographic range
R. annulata is found in Colombia, Costa Rica, Ecuador, Honduras, Nicaragua, and Panama.

Lifestyle 
Little is known about reproduction and lifestyle. The male drool during the courtship on the female's head. A laying consists of only one or two eggs that are approximately 3.5 by 7 centimeters long. When the young turtles crawl out of the egg, they are already relatively large and have a shield length of approximately 6.3 cm.

The brown tortoise is a herbivore that feeds on parts of plants such as leaves and various seeds. The turtle is day active, with a peak in the morning and also after heavy rainfall there is an increased activity. At night the turtle hides among the leaves, while the water is sought to cool down in the heat.

References

Further reading
Boulenger GA (1889). Catalogue of the Chelonians, Rhynchocephalians, and Crocodiles in the British Museum (Natural History). New Edition. London: Trustees of the British Museum (Natural History). (Taylor and Francis, printers). x + 311 pp. + Plates I–III. (Nicoria annulata and N. gabbii, p. 126).
Gray JE (1860). "Description of a New Species of Geoclemmys from Ecuador". Proc. Zool. Soc. London 1860: 231–132 + Plate XXIX. (Geoclemmys annulata, new species).
Mittermeier RA (1971). "Notes on the behavior and ecology of Rhinoclemmys annulata Gray". Herpetologica 27 (4): 485–488.

Rhinoclemmys
Turtles of South America
Reptiles of Colombia
Reptiles of Costa Rica
Reptiles of Ecuador
Reptiles of Honduras
Reptiles of Nicaragua
Reptiles of Panama
Reptiles described in 1860
Taxa named by John Edward Gray
Taxonomy articles created by Polbot